Frederick Stanley Field (12 June 1914 – 2004) was an English professional footballer who played in the Football League for Bradford Park Avenue and Mansfield Town.

References

1914 births
2004 deaths
English footballers
Association football forwards
English Football League players
Bradford (Park Avenue) A.F.C. players
Ashfield United F.C. players
Mansfield Town F.C. players